Kamiljon Tukhtaev (born October 30, 1997) is an Uzbekistani alpine ski racer.

Career
Tukhtaev competed at the 2015 World Championships in Beaver Creek, USA, in the giant slalom. Tukhtaev did not complete the race.

Tukhtaev was the only alpine skier to compete for Uzbekistan at the 2018 Winter Olympics in Pyeongchang, South Korea, where he competed in giant slalom.

References

External links

1997 births
Uzbekistani male alpine skiers
Living people
Place of birth missing (living people)
Alpine skiers at the 2018 Winter Olympics
Alpine skiers at the 2022 Winter Olympics
Olympic alpine skiers of Uzbekistan
Competitors at the 2017 Winter Universiade
Competitors at the 2019 Winter Universiade